Nicholas Anthony Rizzo (born 9 June 1979) is an Australian former footballer. Rizzo began his career in England with Liverpool, however, he made his professional debut for Crystal Palace where he featured in the Premier League. He then moved to Italy and played with Ternana, AC Ancona and AC Prato before returning to England with Milton Keynes Dons, Grimsby Town and Chesterfield. He has since played in his native land for Perth Glory, Central Coast Mariners and APIA Leichhardt Tigers. He has been capped once for Australia.

Club career

After being educated at playing school football at Waverley College in Sydney, Rizzo arrived in England in 1996 joining English giants Liverpool. Although not capped in the first team, the then 18-year-old was an unused substitute on six occasions in the Premier League season 1997/98. He was then lured to Crystal Palace by Terry Venables for two seasons and featured in 36 league games before moving to Italian Serie B side Ternana in 2000. At Palace he scored three times; once in the league against Norwich City and twice in a League Cup tie against Colchester United (once in the first leg and once in the second leg).

Following three injury plagued seasons with a knee injury in Italy he then joined English League 1 side Milton Keynes Dons (formerly Wimbledon F.C.) on a free transfer in November 2004, where he became a firm favourite with the fans. He is a lively and tricky player, known for his crossing and readiness to shoot on sight as well as his hard work and discipline. The summer of 2006 was not the best of times for Rizzo, who featured in the Dons' first pre-season game against Derby County but suffered with injury later in the season before going on loan to league two side Grimsby Town and then league one side Chesterfield in 2007. It was announced on 8 May 2007 that Rizzo's contract with M K Dons had been terminated by mutual consent.

He then signed a two-year contract with Perth Glory on 19 May 2007, and made his debut on 26 August 2007, coming on in the 69th minute for Naum Sekulovski in a game against the Newcastle Jets.

Rizzo was not offered a new contract at Perth Glory, and went on to sign a short-term deal for the Central Coast Mariners to play in their AFC Champions League campaign. It was announced on 20 May 2009, that Nick Rizzo's contract with Central Coast Mariners would not be re-signed. Rizzo went on to play for APIA Leichhardt Tigers until 2011.

International career
Nicky has represented Australia at the U17, U20, U23 level and is a full Australian international when he played for the Socceroos against Croatia in 1998. He also played in the 2000 Olympics for the Australian U23 team which failed to go past the group stages.

Coaching career
Since retiring Rizzo has set up his own soccer school named "Nick Rizzo International Football School".

A-League career statistics
(Correct as of 2 February 2009)

References

External links
 Central Coast Mariners profile
 Oz Football profile
 
 Nick Rizzo International Football School

1979 births
Living people
Soccer players from Sydney
Australian people of Italian descent
Australian expatriate soccer players
Australia international soccer players
Australian expatriate sportspeople in England
Olympic soccer players of Australia
Footballers at the 2000 Summer Olympics
A-League Men players
Serie B players
A.C. Ancona players
A.C. Prato players
APIA Leichhardt FC players
Central Coast Mariners FC players
Chesterfield F.C. players
Crystal Palace F.C. players
Grimsby Town F.C. players
Liverpool F.C. players
Milton Keynes Dons F.C. players
Perth Glory FC players
Sydney Olympic FC players
Ternana Calcio players
Association football midfielders
Australian soccer players